Nantong High School of Jiangsu Province ( shortname: 通中, Tong-Zhong) is a high school in Nantong, Jiangsu, People's Republic of China. It has been regarded as an elite school since 1930s. Alumni include 20 academicians of the Chinese Academy of Science and  the Chinese Academy of Engineering, 5 summer Olympics game gold medalists, many nationally renowned artists, and an exceptional number of politicians and public servants.

Nantong High School of Jiangsu Province was funded in 1909 by Zhang Jian, a well-known industrialist and educator in the late Qing Dynasty. It was the first modern middle school in the city of Nantong. It is now one of the provincial key middle schools in Jiangsu. The school motto is Cheng-Heng (Simplified Chinese: 诚恒; English: honesty in a man and perseverance in study).

The school is highly selective. Admission of pupils are judged almost exclusively by the scores in entrance exams. Exceptions are made only when the pupil is considered talented.

Notable alumni

Scientists 
 Wei Jiangong (魏建功): linguist, member of the Chinese Academy of Sciences
 Yuan Hanqing (袁翰清): chemist, member of the Chinese Academy of Sciences
 Li Ta-tsien (李大潜 Li Daqian), mathematician, member of the French Academy of Sciences
 Yang lo (杨乐): mathematician, member of the Chinese Academy of Sciences
 Wang Xi (王曦): physicist, member of the Chinese Academy of Sciences
 Guan Weiyan (管惟炎): physicist, member of the Chinese Academy of Sciences
 Shi Yafeng (施雅风): geologist, member of the Chinese Academy of Sciences
 Yan Zhida (严志达): mathematician, member of the Chinese Academy of Sciences
 Zhang Miman (张弥曼): paleontologist, member of the Chinese Academy of Sciences

Politicians 
 Gu Hao (顾浩): former vice-governor of Jiangsu Province
 Huang Zhendong (黄镇东): former minister of Ministry of Transportation
 Li Jinhua (李金华): former auditor-general, National Audit Office
 He Zhukang (何竹康): former governor of Henan Province, former governor of Jilin Province

Artists 
 Zao Wou-Ki (赵无极): painter, member of the Académie des Beaux-Arts in Paris
 Fan Zeng (范曾): painter, poet, calligrapher

References

Nantong
Education in Jiangsu
Schools in Jiangsu